The 2020 San Diego Toreros football team represented the University of San Diego during the 2020–21 NCAA Division I FCS football season. They were led by eighth-year head coach Dale Lindsey and played their home games at Torero Stadium. They competed as a member of the Pioneer Football League (PFL).

Previous season 
The Toreros finished the 2019 season 9–3, 8–0 in PFL play to be PFL champions. They earned the PFL's automatic bid to the FCS Playoffs where they lost in the first round to Northern Iowa.

Schedule
San Diego released their schedule on February 12, 2020. The Toreros had a game scheduled against Georgetown (November 21), but the game was canceled on July 13 due to the Patriot League's decision to cancel fall sports due to the COVID-19 pandemic. San Diego's games scheduled against UC Davis (September 5) and Cal Poly (September 19) were canceled on July 27 due to the Pioneer Football League's decision to play a conference-only schedule due to COVID-19.

References

San Diego
San Diego Toreros football seasons
San Diego Toreros football